Léon Bertrand (born 11 May 1951) is a French politician. Previously a professor of physics and biology, he was Mayor of Saint-Laurent-du-Maroni from 1983 until 2018. He was elected to the French National Assembly for the Rally for the Republic representing French Guiana's 2nd constituency in 1988 and was reelected at every election till 2007.

Biography
He described himself in an article published in the French daily Libération when he was a minister, in 2005: "Born on the banks of the Maroni River, in Guyana, a French département in Amazonia situated 7,000 km afar from Paris, grandson of a convict from Vendée who had married a Black woman after his liberation, son of a Creole father and of an Amerindian Surinamese mother, I am Léon Bertrand, with a name typically French but with a physical appearance typically exotic."

He joined the UMP in 2002, and, as a known confidant of President Jacques Chirac, he was named Secretary of State for Tourism in 2002 and later Delegate Minister for Tourism in 2004. He held this office until 15 May 2007. When he was a minister, he realized that "several times, when I received in my office people who didn't know my physical appearance, their republican respectful  «Monsieur le ministre» was automatically addressed to my advisor, who was white, and not to me. But what's for me quite exceptional and has very minor consequences as a public person is, on the contrary, the daily lot of all those who belong to what people label «Visible minority»."

Running for re-election as deputy in the 2007 French legislative election, he was surprisingly defeated with 47.1% of the votes in the runoff against Chantal Berthelot (PSG), who won 52.9%. Nonetheless, he was re-elected Mayor of Saint-Laurent-du-Maroni in 2008 by a large margin.

He was nominated as the UMP's top candidate in the 2010 regional elections in French Guiana.

During the night of 27–28 November 2009, Léon Bertrand was arrested and put into custody on charges of favoritism and corruption.

Despite still being in custody, he is candidate on the third place of a right wing list not endorsed by the UMP for the March 2010 regional elections in French Guiana. In 2013, he was sentenced to 3 years imprisonment.

Political career

 1983-2018 : Mayor of Saint-Laurent-du-Maroni
 2001- : President of the Community of Communes of Western Guiana.
 1982-1988: General Councillor of French Guiana, canton of Saint-Laurent-du-Maroni
 1983-2003: Regional Councillor of French Guiana
 1988-2007: RPR and then UMP-aligned Député of the Second Circumscription of French Guiana
 2002-2004: Secretary of State for Tourism, responsible to the Minister of Transport, Infrastructure, Tourism and Sea
 2004-2007: Delegate Minister for Tourism, responsible to the Minister of Transport, Infrastructure, Tourism and Sea

Sources

External links 
 page on the French National Assembly website
Page for Bertrand on premier-ministre.gouv.fr
About Bertrand and his ministry
EXOTIK, Sieht er denn aus wie ein Minister? Berliner Zeitung vom 19./20. November 2005 (German)

1951 births
Living people
French Guianan people of indigenous peoples descent
French Guianan people of Surinamese descent
French Guianan politicians
Rally for the Republic politicians
Union for a Popular Movement politicians
Government ministers of France
Mayors of places in French Guiana
French people of French Guianan descent
People from Saint-Laurent-du-Maroni
Deputies of the 9th National Assembly of the French Fifth Republic
Deputies of the 10th National Assembly of the French Fifth Republic
Deputies of the 11th National Assembly of the French Fifth Republic
Deputies of the 12th National Assembly of the French Fifth Republic
Black French politicians
Members of Parliament for French Guiana
French politicians convicted of corruption